The 2004 Gaz de France Stars was a tennis tournament played on indoor hard courts. It was the inaugural edition of the Gaz de France Stars, and was part of the WTA International tournaments of the 2004 WTA Tour. It took place in Hasselt, Belgium, in late September to early October, 2004.

Singles entrants

Seeds 

 Rankings as of September 20, 2004

Other entrants 
The following players received wildcards into the singles main draw:
  Els Callens
  Caroline Maes
  Magdalena Maleeva

The following players received entry from the qualifying draw:
  Angelika Bachmann
  Eva Birnerová
  Vanessa Henke
  Lindsay Lee-Waters

The following players received entry as a lucky loser:
  Michaela Paštiková
  Capucine Rousseau

Withdrawals 
  Anca Barna
  Nathalie Dechy (left thigh sprain)
  Émilie Loit (pelvis injury)

Champions

Singles

 Kim Clijsters def.  Francesca Schiavone, 6–2, 6–3

Doubles

 Émilie Loit /  Katarina Srebotnik def.  Michaëlla Krajicek /  Ágnes Szávay, 6–3, 6–4

References

Gaz de France Stars
Gaz de France Stars
Sport in Hasselt
Gaz